St. Martin's Church is a Lutheran church in Riga, the capital of Latvia. It is a parish church of the Evangelical Lutheran Church of Latvia. The church is situated at the address 34 Slokas Street. Church is consecrated in 1852 and designed in Neo-Gothic forms by Johann Felsko.

References 

Churches in Riga